General elections were held in Niue on June 7, 2008. They were initially expected to be held in April, but were delayed until June 2008.  Niue has a 20-member legislative assembly, called the Niue Assembly, whose members are elected by approximately 600 registered voters. The assembly consists of 20 total members, 6 elected on a common roll and 14 representatives of the villages

Election management 
The election was managed and controlled by the Chief Electoral Officer, Togia Sioneholo, who is also the Secretary of the Niue Department of Justice, Lands and Survey.  However, since Sioneholo was also a candidate, he had to go on leave as required by the Niue Public Service Regulations. Hubert Kalauni took over the control and management of the election as Sioneholo's replacement. (Sioneholo won a seat in the Niue Legislative Assembly.)

Timetable
22 May 2008 12pm - Closing of Nominations
30 May 2008 12pm - Closing Withdrawal of Nominations
28 May 2008 - Closing of Registration and Objection of Names in the Electoral Roll.
7 June 2008 - Polling Day

Results
Only three of the six sitting common assembly members retained their seats in the general election. O'Love Jacobsen, who has been a member of the Niue Legislative Assembly for twenty years and was re-elected, remarked that the election was a call for change by Niuean voters. Jacobsen believed that the election would lead to a new government and a new Premier of Niue. She openly supported Toke Talagi's candidacy for the incoming prime ministership against current Premier Young Vivian.

One of the three incumbent common assembly MPs who failed to be re-elected was Hima Douglas, former High Commissioner to New Zealand, who was unseated by Niue's Secretary of Justice Togia Sioneholo. Two female candidates, Mahetoi Hekau and Esther Pavihi, were elected as new members thereby unseating two incumbent MPs, Michael Jackson and Krypton Okesene.

In the capital and main village of Alofi, challenger Dalton Tagelagi easily defeated the incumbent member in the Alofi South constituency.

Common roll
Final results according to Acting Chief Electoral Officer Mr Hubert Kalauni:

Constituencies

Aftermath
Despite the fact that new members, including Togia Sioneholo, Mahetoi Hekau and Esther Pavihi, were elected to the legislative assembly, no single candidate for the premiership had a clear majority.

The highest polling candidate in the election, incumbent MP Toke Talagi, stated he was considering to challenge Young Vivian for the premier's post; caretaker Deputy Premier Fisa Pihigia stated he would also stand if Talagi decided to stand, as Pihigia considered himself to be better suited to fend off a challenge from Talagi than Vivian.

Eventually, Talagi and Vivian stood for premier. Talagi was elected on Thursday, June 26, 2008, with fourteen votes to Vivian's five, with one abstaining.

Atapana Siakimotu was returned unopposed as Speaker of the House.

On Thursday 20 June 2008, Hon Premier Toke Talagi announced through TV Niue the other three members of his Cabinet of Ministers, Hon Pokotoa Sipeli, Hon Togia Sioneholo and Hon O'love Tauveve Jacobsen.

References

External links 
Niue Business News: Summary of official election results

Non-partisan elections
2008 elections in Oceania
Elections in Niue
General election
June 2008 events in Oceania